Nila Valeryivnia Kryukova (14 November 1943, in Popivka, Nikolayev – 5 October 2018) was a Ukrainian actress . She was awarded a 1985 People's Artist of Ukraine, 1989 Shevchenko National Prize, 2006 Order of Prince Yaroslav the Wise, and 2008 Hero of Ukraine.

Life 
She graduated from the Kiev State Institute of Theatre Arts. From 1967 to 1968, she was at the Nikolai Gogol Drama Theatre.  Between 1970 and 1975 she was at the "Word" literary theatre of the National Writers' Union of Ukraine. She was an actress at the National Philharmonic of Ukraine.  She starred in the movies "Na Kyjiwskomunaprjamku" (1968); "Propala hramota"(1972) and "Kaidaschewa sim'ja" (1996).

References 

1943 births
2018 deaths
People of the Revolution on Granite
Ukrainian actresses